Findlay is a surname of Scottish origin.

People with surname Findlay
Adrian Findlay (born 1982), Jamaican sprinter
Alexander Findlay, several people
Anna Findlay (1885–1968), British artist
Andrew Findlay ( 1920s), Scottish footballer
Arthur Findlay (1883–1964), English writer, accountant, stockbroker, magistrate and spiritualist
barbara findlay, Canadian lawyer
Bill Findlay (1913–1986), Australian rules footballer
Billy Findlay (born 1970), Scottish former footballer
Brent Findlay (born 1985), New Zealand cricketer
Brett Findlay (born 1972), British film and stage actor
D. Cameron Findlay (born 1959), American government official and lawyer
Charles Findlay (1891–1971), Royal Air Force officer, World War I flying ace
Conn Findlay (1930–2021), American Olympic medalist in rowing and sailing
Craig Findlay (born 1971), New Zealand cricketer
Dave Finlay (born 1958), British-Irish professional wrestler
David George Findlay (1913–1982), Suriname politician and newspaper owner.
Deborah Findlay (born 1947), English actress
Donald Findlay (born 1951), Scottish advocate; Lord Rector of the University of St Andrews
Sir Edmund Findlay, 2nd Baronet (1902–1962), Scottish politician
Elisabeth Findlay (contemporary), New Zealand fashion designer
Frank Findlay (1884–1945), New Zealand politician
George Findlay (1889–1967), Scottish soldier, recipient of the Victoria Cross
Gillian Findlay (contemporary), Canadian television journalist
Glen Findlay (born 1940), Canadian politician from Manitoba, member of the provincial legislative assembly
Dame Harriet Findlay (1880–1954), British political activist and philanthropist
Hugh Findlay (1822–1900), Scottish Mormon missionary to India
Jack Findlay (1935–2007), Australian motorcycle road racer
Jake Findlay (born 1954), Scottish former footballer
James Findlay, several people
Jessica Brown Findlay (born 1989), English actress
John Findlay, several people 
Kathryn Findlay (1954–2014), British architect
Katie Findlay (born 1990), Canadian actress
Kerry-Lynne Findlay (born 1955),  is the Minister of National Revenue of Canada
Linnie Findlay (1919–2009), American historian and writer
Sir Mansfeldt Findlay (1861–1932), British diplomat
Margaret Cross Primrose Findlay (1902–1968), Scottish artist
Martha Hall Findlay (born 1960), Canadian lawyer, businesswoman and politician
Maude Findlay, fictional character in American sitcom Maude
Maxwell Findlay (1898–1936), Scottish World War I flying ace
Michael Findlay (1938–1977), American film director and producer
Mike Findlay (born 1943), West Indian cricketer
Neil Findlay (born 1969), Scottish politician
Norman Findlay, English footballer
Paula Findlay (born 1989), Canadian triathlete
Polly Findlay, British theatre director
Robert Findlay, several people
Ronald Findlay (born 1935), American professor of economics
Russell Findlay (businessman) (born 1965), American advertising and marketing executive
Ruth Findlay (1896–1949), American actress
Shawn Findlay (born 1984), West Indies cricketer
Stuart Graham Findlay (born 1983), Digital entrepreneur
Tom Findlay, one half of British Electronica duo Groove Armada
Tom Findlay (born 1881), Scottish footballer
William Findlay, several people

Other uses
A sept of the Scottish Clan Farquharson

English-language surnames
Scottish surnames